Başak Gündoğdu (born April 23, 1992) is a Turkish women's football forward currently playing in the Turkish Women's First League for Beşiktaş with jersey number 15. She played in the Turkish girls' U-17, and plays for  the Turkey women's team.

Club career 
Gündoğdu obtained her license for Marmara Üniversitesi Spor on May 4, 2006. She played three seasons between 2008 and 2010 for her club. Then, she was two seasons with Çamlıcaspor. In the 2013–14 season, she returned to her initial club. At the end of the season, she took part at three play-off matches for Ataşehir Belediyespor. She signed with beşiktaş J.K., which played in the Third League. She enjoyed league championship titles and promotions to a higher league with her new club at the end of 2014–15 and 2015–16. She became top scorer in the 2015–16 Women's Second league season with 19 goals sharing the title with İlayda Civelek of Amasya Eğitim Spor.  She enjoyed the champion title of her team Beşiktaş J.K. in the 2018–19 season. She took part at the 2019–20 UEFA Women's Champions League - Group 9 matches. Following her team's champions title in the 2020-21 Turkcell League season, she played in one matc of the 2021–22 UEFA Women's Champions League qualifying rounds.

International career 

Gündoğdu appeared in four friendly matches for national U-17 team in 2006 and 2007. She played in one game of the UEFA Euro 2017 qualifying round.

Career statistics 
.

Honours

Club 
Turkish Women's First League
Ataşehir Belediyespor
 Runners-up (1): 2013–14

Beşiktaş J.K.
 Winners (2): 2018–19, 2020–21
 Runners-up (2): 2016–17, 2017–18

Turkish Women's Second League
Beşiktaş J.K.
 Winners (1): 2015–16
Turkish Women's Third  League
Beşiktaş J.K.
 Winners (1): 2014–15

Individual 
 Turkish Women's Second League
 Top scorer (1): 2015–16 with Beşiktaş J.K. (19 goals).

References

External links 

1992 births
Living people
People from Şişli
Footballers from Istanbul
Turkish women's footballers
Women's association football forwards
Marmara Üniversitesi Spor players
Ataşehir Belediyespor players
Beşiktaş J.K. women's football players
Turkish Women's Football Super League players
21st-century Turkish women